The Merrimack Warriors men's ice hockey team is a National Collegiate Athletic Association (NCAA) Division I college ice hockey program that represents Merrimack College. The Warriors are a member of Hockey East. They play at the 2,549-seat J. Thom Lawler Rink in North Andover, Massachusetts, which underwent renovation in 2010. Merrimack's 92.08% capacity during the 2013–14 season was second in Hockey East.

History
The Warriors started intercollegiate play in 1954–55, as the college offered more support to the program in the form of a modest budget, new uniforms and varsity letters. Babson, Worcester Polytechnic Institute and Keene Teachers were among the first intercollegiate competition Merrimack hockey faced that year. And for the first time, the college recognized hockey as a varsity sport.

They were successful in the late 1970s and early 1980s while playing in the ECAC Division II. Merrimack won the division II national title in 1978 and were the runner up in 1984. They became an NCAA Division I independent team in 1984 but did not play a schedule against predominantly Division I teams until they joined the Hockey East conference in 1989.

Led by Coach Ron Anderson, a new era began for Merrimack hockey in 1989 when the Warriors competed in their first season as a member of the Hockey East Association. That team posted an overall record of 10–24–1, but pulled off the surprise of the season by taking eventual league champion Boston College to a third and decisive playoff game. And after being picked for the bottom part of the league in three of the last four seasons, the Warriors continued to baffle the experts by battling for home-ice advantage all season long while defeating several Top 20 teams. And with the roots of the Merrimack hockey tree that were planted in Hockey East seven years earlier firmly entrenched, the 1996–97 Warriors entered a new chapter in history by qualifying for a Hockey East playoff home ice berth. The 1997–98 team raised the bar a little higher by upsetting top-ranked Boston University in the quarterfinals and earning a trip to the conference semifinals at Boston's FleetCenter.

The 1998–99 season began yet another era in Merrimack hockey history with the dawning of the Serino age. On April 24, 1998, Chris Serino became just the sixth head coach in the program's history. The Warriors posted a mark of 11–24–1 in Serino's inaugural campaign, and senior forward and captain Rejean Stringer was named an All-American, Merrimack's first ever in the University Division. In Serino's second season, the Warriors set an NCAA record for consecutive overtime contests by playing in six straight at the end of January, and in 2000–01, the Warriors notched 14 victories, the most for Merrimack since 1996–97. Several of those victories were over nationally ranked opponents.

In 2002–03, senior goaltender and captain Joe Exter led Merrimack to a surprising race for home ice throughout much of the season, including the team's first-ever regular season Division I tournament title with wins over host Rensselaer and Wayne State at the 52nd Annual Rensselaer/HSBC Holiday Hockey Tournament in late December. Exter was selected to the All-Hockey East Team by league coaches. Long-time assistant coach Stu Irving was also honored, as the American Hockey Coaches Association presented him with its Terry Flanagan Memorial Award in recognition of an assistant coach's career body of work. The season also saw the inauguration of the Blue Line Club, the program's official support organization.

The program struggled in the highly competitive Hockey East. The 2006–07 season, in which they won only 3 games, was the nadir of their struggles. In the 2010–11 season, however, they had unprecedented success against several of the nation's top teams. They finished the regular season 22–8–4 and were ranked 9th in the nation. Merrimack gained a home ice advantage for the first round for the first time since 1997.

The program received its first No. 1 ranking in the USCHO Poll during the 2011–12 season.

Mark Dennehy was fired as the team's head coach at the conclusion of the 2017–18 season following a 12–21–4 record and a sixth straight losing season. Scott Borek was hired as the team's head coach on April 9, 2018.

Season-by-season results

Source:

All-time coaching records
As of the completion of 2021–22 season

Awards and honors

NCAA

Individual Awards

Tim Taylor Award
Stéphane Da Costa, C: 2010

All-American Teams
AHCA Second Team All-Americans

1998–99: Rejean Stringer, F
2010–11: Stéphane Da Costa, F
2011–12: Joe Cannata, G
2012–13: Mike Collins, F

Hockey East

Individual Awards

Rookie of the Year
Stéphane Da Costa, C: 2010

Three-Stars Award
Joe Exter, G: 2003

Goaltending Champion
Collin Delia: 2017

Coach of the Year
Mark Dennehy: 2010

All-Conference Teams
First Team

1994–95: Martin Legault, G
1996–97: Martin Legault, G
2011–12: Joe Cannata, G
2012–13: Mike Collins, F

Second Team

1998–99: Rejean Stringer, F
2000–01: Anthony Aquino, F
2002–03: Joe Exter, G
2004–05: Bryan Schmidt, D
2009–10: Stéphane Da Costa, D
2010–11: Stéphane Da Costa, D
2011–12: Karl Stollery, D
2012–13: Jordan Heywood, D
2021–22: Declan Carlile, D

Third Team

2016–17: Collin Delia, G
2017–18: Brett Seney, F

Rookie Team

1992–93: Mark Goble, F
1993–94: John Jakopin, F
1994–95: Casey Kesselring, F
1995–96: Darrel Scoville, D
1998–99: Greg Classen, F
1999–00: Anthony Aquino, F
2000–01: Joe Exter, G
2002–03: Bryan Schmidt, D
2003–04: Jim Healey, G
2005–06: Rob Ricci, F
2008–09: Karl Stollery, D
2009–10: Stéphane Da Costa, F
2010–11: Mike Collins, F
2018–19: Chase Gresock, F
2019–20: Declan Carlile, D
2020–21: Alex Jefferies, F

Statistical Leaders
Source:

Career points leaders

Career goaltending leaders

GP = Games played; Min = Minutes played; W = Wins; L = Losses; T = Ties; GA = Goals against; SO = Shutouts; SV% = Save percentage; GAA = Goals against average

minimum 30 games played

Statistics current through the start of the 2018–19 season.

Current roster
As of September 27, 2022.

Olympians
This is a list of Merrimack alumni were a part of an Olympic team.

Warriors in the NHL
As of July 1, 2022.

Source:

References

External links
Merrimack ice hockey at Merrimack Athletics

 
Ice hockey teams in Massachusetts